Mount Shand is a  elevation glaciated summit located at the head of the Trident Glacier in the eastern Alaska Range, in Alaska, United States. It is the third-highest peak in the Hayes Range, a subset of the Alaska Range. Mount Moffit, the nearest higher neighbor, is set  to the northeast, and McGinnis Peak is positioned  to the east. This rarely climbed mountain has three large sweeping faces, the East, West, and South.

This mountain is named for William Shand Jr. (1918–1946), a mountaineer who made the first ascents of nearby Mount Moffit in August 1942, and Mount Hayes on August 1, 1941. Following Shand's untimely death in a tragic car crash,  Bradford Washburn, also of the Hayes first ascent party, proposed this name in 1949 to be applied to what is now called Mount Moffit. The present application of the name was suggested in 1961 by the U.S. Geological Survey to resolve the conflict of two names applied to the same geographic feature. The name and summit location was officially adopted in 1962 by the U.S. Board on Geographic Names.

Climate

Based on the Köppen climate classification, Mount Shand is located in a subarctic climate zone with long, cold, snowy winters, and mild summers. This climate supports the Trident and Black Rapids Glaciers surrounding this peak. Temperatures can drop below −20 °C with wind chill factors below −30 °C. The months May through June offer the most favorable weather for climbing or viewing. Precipitation runoff from the mountain drains into tributaries of the Tanana River drainage basin.

See also

List of mountain peaks of Alaska
Geology of Alaska

References

Gallery

External links
 William Shand Jr: biography
 Mount Shand: Flickr photo
 Summit detail: Flickr photo
 Weather forecast: Mount Shand

Alaska Range
Landforms of Southeast Fairbanks Census Area, Alaska
Mountains of Alaska
North American 3000 m summits